National Highway 544H, commonly referred to as NH 544H is a national highway of India. It starts from NH 44 near Thoppur, passes through Mettur, Bhavani and terminates at Erode. It intersects NH 544 near Lakshmi Nagar, Erode.

Route 
Thoppur, Mechcheri, Mettur, Nerinchipettai, Ammapettai, Chittar Bhavani, Erode road.

Junctions  

  Terminal near Thoppur.
  near Lakshmi Nagar, Erode.
  near Central Bus Terminus, Erode.

Project development 
Post declaration of this national highway on 6 June 2017, process of 4 laning of road has been taken up.

Recently in 2022, the stretch from Thoppur to R.N.Pudur in Erode has been sanctioned for upgrading into 2 lane with paved shoulders for a length of 85km under 4 packages and the work is in progress.

See also 
 List of National Highways in India
 List of National Highways in India by state

References

External links 

 NH 544H on OpenStreetMap

National highways in India
National Highways in Tamil Nadu
Transport in Erode